Haribhai Deokaran High School (HDHS) is a public Marathi and Semi-English Medium School in Solapur, Maharashtra, India. HDHS consists of a high school from Grade V to Grade X and an Arts, Commerce and Science Junior college.  The high school has a Primary School campus and is called as Nutan Marathi Vidyalaya (Devanagari: नुतन मराठी विद्यालय).

History
The school was founded by the Shikshan Prasarak Mandali, Pune in 1918. It was named after the Haribhai Deokaran Trading Company, whose owner Hirakaka Gandhi had donated  27000 to establish the school.

The founder members were educationists and social reformers from Pune. including, They were Mr. Deo R.G, Mr. Kulkarni R.B, Mr. Karambalekar D.S  and Mr. Dongare K.B. The school was started with just 108 students and now the number has reached up to 3500 students.

Notable alumni
 Polly Umrigar - former Indian cricket captain. 
 Jabbar Patel, film director
 Achyut Godbole, businessman, writer
 Atul Kulkarni, actor
 Uday Umesh Lalit, 49th Chief Justice of India
 Aroon Tikekar, Indian scholar

References

External links

1918 establishments in India
Education in Solapur
High schools and secondary schools in Maharashtra